The 1991–92 NSJHL season was the 24th season for the North Saskatchewan Junior B Hockey League.  Seven teams completed a 42-game season.

League notes
Overtime games ending in a tie go to a shoot out.  The winner of the shoot out gets 2 points and the win.  The loser gets the tie and 1 point.

Regular season

Final standings

y=first-round bye

x=playoff berth

Scoring leaders
Note: GP = Games played; G = Goals; A = Assists; Pts = Points

Top goaltenders
Note: Min = Minutes played; G/A = Goals against; SO = Shutouts; AVG = Goals-against average

NSJHL playoffs

Quarter-finals = Best of 5

Semi-finals & finals = Best of 7

NSJHL All-Star Team

1st Team

2nd Team

NSJHL Awards

See also
 North Saskatchewan Junior Hockey League
 Kinistino Tigers
 Athol Murray Trophy
 Keystone Cup

External links
Prairie Junior Hockey League

Ice hockey leagues in Saskatchewan